Limnaecia eumeristis is a moth in the family Cosmopterigidae. It is found on Samoa.

References

Natural History Museum Lepidoptera generic names catalog

Limnaecia
Moths described in 1927
Taxa named by Edward Meyrick
Moths of Oceania